Premaka Gurushantha (born 2 September 1887, died 1950) was the first bishop in the Church of South India Diocese of Mysore.

Gurushantha studied divinity at the United Theological College, Bangalore between 1912 and 1916

Gurushantha hailed from a Methodist background; in 1947 he was consecrated as bishop along with eight others at St. George's Cathedral, Chennai.

References

People from Tumkur district
Kannada people
21st-century Anglican bishops in India
Anglican bishops of Mysore
1887 births
1950 deaths
Indian Christian theologians
Senate of Serampore College (University) alumni